Nooranad Haneef was an Indian author in Malayalam-language from Quilon, Kerala. Haneef published around 32 works including novels, short stories, travelogues and children's literature.

Life
Haneef was born on 20 February 1935 to Thampi Rawther and Sulekha at Nooranad in the present-day Alleppey district of Kerala, India. He completed his schooling from Athikkattukulangara Lower Primary School, Nooranad Upper Primary School and Adoor High School and graduated in Malayalam literature from NSS College Pandalam. He taught Malayalam at the West Quilon Government High School, Quilon for over 35 years. He published his first novel Theeram Kanaatha Thiramalakal in 1967. He published around 32 works including 24 novels and two travelogues.

He served as a member of several literary organisations including Kerala Sahitya Akademi, Samastha Kerala Sahithya Parishad, Sahitya Pravarthaka Sahakarana Sangam and Authors Guild of India. He was also advisory committee member of All India Radio, Trivandrum and governing body member of the Quilon Public Library and Research Centre. He died on 5 August 2006 at a private hospital in Quilon. He had been undergoing treatment for cancer for a long time.

List of works
 Novel
 Theeram Kanaatha Thiramalakal
 Gotha
 Kizhakkottu Ozhukunna Puzha
 Ivide Janichavar
 Kireedamillathe Chenkolillathe
 Athirathram
 Adimakalude Adima
 Champalinte Puthri
 Agnimegham
 Agnivarsham
 Urvashi
 Kalapani
 Athirukalkkappuram

 Travelogue
 Thalasthanam Muthal Thalasthanam Vare
 Nizaminte Naattil

 Children's literature
 Chellakkili Chemmanakkili

See also
 Nooranad Haneef Award

References

People from Kollam
Malayali people
Indian male novelists
Novelists from Kerala
Malayalam-language writers
Malayalam novelists
20th-century Indian male writers
20th-century Indian novelists
1935 births
2006 deaths